Penlan is a suburban area of Swansea, Wales in the Penderry ward.  The area is set on top of a hill, which overlooks Townhill, Kilvey Hill and Swansea Bay.

Leisure
Local amenities include the Penlan leisure centre, which incorporates a swimming pool and sports hall, and the Penlan Library..

Transport
The headquarters of the main public transport company serving South West Wales, First Cymru, is located here.

Education and religion
Penlan is home to Ysgol Gyfun Gymraeg Bryn Tawe, a Welsh-medium secondary school.  There's two Primary School which is Clwyd Community Primary and Afryn.  The area is served by two churches. Penlan Methodist Church, in existence for fifty years, and Cornerstone Church, a thriving evangelical church which was established in 1991.

The hymn tune ‘Penlan’ was written in 1890 by the composer David Jenkins (1848-1915) and is frequently sung to the words ‘In heavenly love abiding’.

Housing
Penlan is a Communities First area.

References

Districts of Swansea